The 2007 Supersport World Championship was the ninth F.I.M. Supersport World Championship season—the eleventh taking into account the two held under the name of Supersport World Series. The season started on 24 February at Losail and finished on 7 October at Magny-Cours after 13 rounds. Kenan Sofuoğlu won the riders' championship with a record 8 wins. Honda won the manufacturers' championship.

Race calendar and results

Championship standings

Riders' standings

Manufacturers' standings

Entry list

References

External links

Supersport
Supersport World Championship seasons
World
World
World